Radeon 5000 series may refer to two different series of graphics processing units (GPUs) developed by Advanced Micro Devices:

 Radeon RX 5000 series, released in 2019
 Radeon HD 5000 series, released in 2009 under the ATI brand name